One Voice may refer to:

Films
 One Voice (film), 2011 documentary on high school Hawaiian choral groups

Organizations
One Voice (organization), a Philippine political group opposing the proposed constitutional changes or "Charter Change"
One Voice (France), a French organisation founded by Muriel Arnal in 1995 under the patronage of Professor Theodore Monod (1902-2000) for the absolute animals’ rights to respect
One Voice Children's Choir, a children's choir based in Utah
One Voice Mixed Chorus, a GLBTA mixed chorus in Minnesota
OneVoice Movement, an international mainstream grassroots movement in Israel/Palestine empowering moderates for conflict resolution
One Voice Technologies, a developer of intelligent personal assistant technology

Music

Bands
One Voice (group), an all-girl singing group, stylized as OneVo1ce

Albums
One Voice (Barry Manilow album), 1979
One Voice (Barbra Streisand album), 1987
One Voice (Agnostic Front album), 1992
One Voice (Billy Gilman album), 2000
One Voice (Andrew Johnston album), 2008
One Voice (Micah Stampley album), 2011
One Voice (Aled Jones album), 2016
One Voice at Christmas, Aled Jones follow-up later the same year
One Voice (Kyuhyun album), 2017

Songs
"One Voice" (Billy Gilman song), the lead single from Billy Gilman's album One Voice
"One Voice", a song by Brandy from her album Never Say Never
"One Voice", a song by the Gear Daddies from their album Billy's Live Bait
"One Voice", a song by Pennywise from their album Straight Ahead
"One Voice", a song by Patti Smith from her album Gung Ho
"One Voice", a song from Barry Manilow's One Voice
"One Voice", a song by The Wailin' Jennys on their album 40 Days